Işın Show was a short-lived talk show which aired on atv in 2005. The show was hosted by Turkish pop singer Işın Karaca.

The show hosted famous Turkish singers such as Yıldız Tilbe, Ebru Gündeş, Özlem Tekin and İzel. There were small skits throughout the show with names such as "Börül Abla" or "Barbi bebekler". DJ Çığırtkan also featured in the show with announcements and skits.

The show used Işınla Beni (Turkish: Teleport me, a pun with her name Işın which means "light" in Turkish) in the promotions before the original air.

Episode list

References

External links 
 

Turkish television talk shows
Işın Karaca
2005 Turkish television series debuts
2005 Turkish television series endings
2000s Turkish television series
ATV (Turkey) original programming